The South Abbey was a Franciscan friary in Youghal, Ireland active between the 13th and 17th centuries.

History 
The Franciscan Friary of South Abbey, Youghal was founded in 1224 by Maurice FitzGerald, 2nd Lord of Offaly, and he was buried there in 1257.  His grandson Thomas FitzGerald had founded the Dominican Priory of North Abbey, Youghal.

Samuel Lewis in his Topographical Dictionary of Ireland written in 1837 said of it:

In 1224, Maurice FitzGerald founded a Franciscan monastery on the south side of the town, which was the first religious foundation of the order in Ireland.  It is recorded that he originally intended the building for a castle, but that, in consequence of some harsh treatment which the workmen received from his eldest son, he changed his design and determined to devote it to religious uses: but, dying in 1257, it was completed in 1260 by his youngest son, Thomas.

The exact year of when the first Franciscans came to Youghal, is uncertain and some sources cite 1224, and others 1226.  Either way both dates are close to the lifetime of St. Francis of Assisi.

The Friary were dissolved in the 16th century, and no remains of it can be seen today.

However some local sources suggest that there was some remains but were demolished when the site became home to the Pugin designed convent of the Presentation Sisters.

Today 
The convent has since closed and is now an International college  The nearby south abbey national school has now moved into a renovated school on the golf links road, leaving the old school empty.

See also 
 List of abbeys and priories in Ireland (County Cork)
 Youghal
 Youghal Priory
 North Abbey, Youghal
 Molana Abbey
 Rincrew Abbey

References

Sources 
 Samuel Lewis, Topographical Dictionary of Ireland, 1837.

Franciscan monasteries in the Republic of Ireland
Religion in Youghal
Buildings and structures in Youghal
1224 establishments in Ireland
Religious organizations established in the 1220s
Christian monasteries established in the 13th century
Burial sites of the FitzGerald dynasty